Lophostachys falcata is a plant native to the Cerrado vegetation of Brazil. This plant is cited in Flora Brasiliensis by Carl Friedrich Philipp von Martius.

External links
  Flora Brasiliensis: Lophostachys falcata

falcata
Flora of Brazil